Tyler Ryan Jay (born April 19, 1994) is an American professional baseball pitcher for the Joliet Slammers of the Frontier League. He played college baseball at the University of Illinois and was drafted by the Minnesota Twins in the first round of the 2015 MLB draft.

Career

Amateur career 
Jay attended Lemont High School in Lemont, Illinois. He played both baseball and football at Lemont. Jay committed to the University of Illinois to play college baseball for the Fighting Illini. As a freshman, he appeared in 18 games, going 1–3 with a 3.10 earned run average (ERA) and 20 strikeouts. As a sophomore in 2014, he took over as the closer and had 10 saves, a 1.94 ERA and 47 strikeouts. After the season, Jay played for the United States collegiate national team during the summer, and also played collegiate summer baseball for the Yarmouth-Dennis Red Sox of the Cape Cod Baseball League. As a junior in 2015, he had a 1.08 ERA, 76 strikeouts and 14 saves.

Minnesota Twins 
Jay was considered one of the top prospects for the 2015 Major League Baseball Draft. The Minnesota Twins selected him with the sixth overall pick. He officially signed with the Twins on June 17 and was assigned to the Fort Myers Miracle where he posted a 3.93 ERA in 18.1 innings pitched. The Twins transitioned Jay into a starting pitcher with Fort Myers in 2016, where he posted a 5–5 record with a 2.84 ERA in 13 starts before being promoted to the Chattanooga Lookouts where he pitched to a 5.79 ERA in five games (two starts). He pitched only 11.2 innings in 2017 due to injury. Jay returned in 2018 to pitch for the Chattanooga Lookouts, compiling a 4–5 record with a 4.22 ERA in 38 games. Jay would begin the 2019 season with the Chattanooga Lookouts where he posted a 1–2 record with a 4.82 ERA in 17 appearances.

Cincinnati Reds
On June 10, 2019, Jay was traded to the Cincinnati Reds in exchange for cash considerations. Jay would spend the rest of the 2020 season between the Pensacola Blue Wahoos and the AZL Reds where he posted a 0–0 record with a 3.03 ERA in 18 appearances and a 0–0 record with a 9.00 ERA in 2 appearances respectively. On June 1, 2020, Jay was released by the Reds.

Joliet Slammers
On June 7, 2022, Jay signed with the Joliet Slammers of the Frontier League.

References

External links

Illinois Fighting Illini bio

1994 births
Living people
People from Lemont, Illinois
Baseball players from Illinois
Baseball pitchers
Illinois Fighting Illini baseball players
All-American college baseball players
Yarmouth–Dennis Red Sox players
Gulf Coast Twins players
Fort Myers Miracle players
Chattanooga Lookouts players
Surprise Saguaros players
Arizona League Reds players
Pensacola Blue Wahoos players
Minor league baseball players